Doupě is a municipality and village in Jihlava District in the Vysočina Region of the Czech Republic. It has about 100 inhabitants.

Etymology
The name means literally "den". Figuratively, it refers to the enclosed valley in which the village is located.

Geography
The southern part of the municipal territory with the village lies in the Křižanov Highlands, the northern forested part lies in the Javořice Highlands. The territory is rich in ponds.

History
The first written mention of Doupě is from 1580.

Sights
Doupě is known for the Roštejn Castle. The first written mention of the castle is from 1353. Today it is owned by the Vysočina Region and managed by the Vysočina Museum in Jihlava. The castle is open to the public and belongs to the most visited tourist destinations in the region.

References

External links

Villages in Jihlava District